Something Like This is the fourth full-length studio album released by Ben Rector. It peaked at No. 11 on the Billboard Top Independent Albums charts and No. 41 on the Billboard 200.

Track listing
 "Let the Good Times Roll" 3:08
 "Song for the Suburbs" 3:40
 "Never Gonna Let you Go" 3:15
 "Without You" 3:40
 "Hide Away" 3:20
 "You and Me" 3:57
 "She Is" 3:24
 "Wanna be Loved" 3:27
 "Way I Am" 4:08
 "Falling in Love" 2:44
 "Home" 3:36

Charts

References

2011 albums
Ben Rector albums
Self-released albums